Neeraj Kumar is a film maker, actor, writer and director at Neerajfilms and software consultant based in the United States. His debut film, the critically acclaimed children's human rights feature-length documentary film, Child Marriage, won the 2005 New York International Independent Film & Video Festival Best International Documentary Award, and recognition in the South Asian International Film Festival. He is dedicated to making socially conscious documentaries and fiction films.

He is also an actor. He played the leading roles in the satire films titled What the Hell! and The Great Meltdown.

Filmography
 Child Marriage (2005)
  What the Hell  (2006)
  The Great Meltdown (2007)

Awards and recognition
 2005 New York International Independent Film & Video Festival - Best Documentary International
 South Asian International Film Festival - Best Documentary

References

External links
 

Film directors from California
American male film actors
Indian emigrants to the United States
Male actors from Colorado
Male actors from California
American film directors of Indian descent
American male actors of Indian descent
Living people
Year of birth missing (living people)